Bernardo López Obeso (born August 20, 1991, in Guasave, Sinaloa), known as Bernardo López, is a professional Mexican footballer who currently plays for Loros de la Universidad de Colima.

External links
 

1991 births
Living people
Mexican footballers
People from Guasave
Footballers from Sinaloa
Liga MX players
Association football midfielders
21st-century Mexican people